Polymerase stuttering is the process by which a polymerase transcribes a nucleotide several times without progressing further on the mRNA chain.  It is often used in addition of poly A tails or capping mRNA chains by less complex organisms such as viruses.

Process 

A polymerase may undergo stuttering as a probability controlled event, hence it is not explicitly controlled by any mechanisms in the translation process.  Generally, it is a result of many short repeated frameshifts on a slippery sequence of nucleotides on the mRNA strand.  However, the frameshift is restricted to one (in some cases two) nucleotides with a pseudoknot or choke points on both sides of the sequence.

Examples 

A polymerase that exhibits this behavior is RNA-dependent RNA polymerase, present in many RNA viruses.  Reverse transcriptase has also been observed to undergo this polymerase stuttering.

Literature 

Genetics